The Tagula butcherbird (Cracticus louisiadensis) is a species of bird in the family Artamidae.
It is endemic to Tagula Island in Papua New Guinea.

References 

Tagula butcherbird
Birds of Papua New Guinea
Tagula butcherbird
Taxa named by Henry Baker Tristram
Taxonomy articles created by Polbot